Adam F. Poltl (February 6, 1891 – January 15, 1969) was an American businessman and politician.

Poltl was born in Szabadfalva (Freidorf), Austria-Hungary (now a district of the city of Timișoara, Romania). He was in the retail business and a poultry breeder. He was also in horticulture. Poltl was president of the chamber of commerce. He served as clerk of the Hartford, Wisconsin Board of Education. Poltl served as Mayor of Hartford from 1930 to 1938, 1944 to 1946, and 1952 to 1953. Poltl also served in the Wisconsin State Assembly, in 1935, on the Wisconsin Progressive Party ticket.

Notes

1891 births
1969 deaths
Businesspeople from Timișoara
Austro-Hungarian emigrants to the United States
People from the Kingdom of Hungary
Wisconsin Progressives (1924)
Members of the Wisconsin State Assembly
People from Hartford, Wisconsin
Businesspeople from Wisconsin
School board members in Wisconsin
Mayors of places in Wisconsin
20th-century American politicians
20th-century American businesspeople